Raymond Hills is a summit located in Central New York Region of New York located in the Town of Ohio in Herkimer County, northeast of Ohio. Honnedaga Lake is located north of the elevation.

References

Mountains of Herkimer County, New York
Mountains of New York (state)